is a  Japanese-American meteorologist and climatologist who pioneered the use of computers to simulate global climate change and natural climate variations. He was awarded the 2021 Nobel Prize in Physics jointly with Klaus Hasselmann and Giorgio Parisi, for his contributions to the physical modeling of earth's climate, quantifying its variability, and predictions of climate change.

Early life and education 
Born in 1931 in Shinritsu Village, Uma District, Ehime Prefecture, Japan. Both his grandfather and his father were physicians, who operated the only clinic in the village. A classmate recalled that, even in elementary school, he was already "interested in the weather, making comments such as 'If Japan didn't have typhoons, we wouldn't have so much rain.'" Manabe attended Ehime Prefectural Mishima High School. When he was accepted into the University of Tokyo, his family expected him to study medicine, but "whenever there's an emergency, the blood rushes to my head, so I would not have made a good doctor." Furthermore, "I had a horrible memory and I was clumsy with my hands. I thought that my only good trait was to gaze at the sky and get lost in my thoughts." He joined the research team of Shigekata Shono (1911-1969), and majored in meteorology. Manabe received a BA degree in 1953, an MA degree in 1955, and a DSc degree in 1958, all from the University of Tokyo.

Career 
After finishing his doctorate, Manabe went to the United States to work at the General Circulation Research Section of the U.S. Weather Bureau, now the Geophysical Fluid Dynamics Laboratory of NOAA, continuing until 1997. From 1997 to 2001, he worked at the Frontier Research System for Global Change in Japan serving as Director of the Global Warming Research Division. In 2002 he returned to the United States as a visiting research collaborator at the Program in Atmospheric and Oceanic Science, Princeton University. He currently serves as senior meteorologist at the university. He also engaged as a specially invited professor at Nagoya University from December 2007 to March 2014.

Scientific accomplishments 
Working at NOAA's Geophysical Fluid Dynamics Laboratory, first in Washington, DC and later in Princeton, New Jersey, Manabe worked with director Joseph Smagorinsky to develop three-dimensional models of the atmosphere. As the first step, Manabe and Wetherald (1967) developed one-dimensional, single-column model of the atmosphere in radiative-convective equilibrium with positive feedback effect of water vapor. Using the model, they found that, in response to the change in atmospheric concentration of carbon dioxide, the temperature increases at the Earth's surface and in the troposphere, whereas it decreases in the stratosphere.

The development of the radiative-convective model was a critically important step towards the development of comprehensive general circulation model of the atmosphere (Manabe et al. 1965). They used the model to simulate for the first time the three-dimensional response of temperature and the hydrologic cycle to increased carbon dioxide (Manabe and Wetherald, 1975). In 1969, Manabe and Bryan published the first simulations of the climate by a coupled ocean-atmosphere models, in which the general circulation model of the atmosphere is combined with that of ocean. 
   
Throughout the 1990s and early 2000s, Manabe's research group published seminal papers using the coupled atmosphere ocean models to investigate the time-dependent response of climate to changing greenhouse gas concentrations of the atmosphere (Stouffer et al., 1989; Manabe et al., 1991 & 1992). They also applied the model to the study of past climate change, including the role of freshwater input to the North Atlantic Ocean as a potential cause of the so-called, abrupt climate change evident in the paleoclimatic record (Manabe and Stouffer, 1995 & 2000). For further details, see the book Beyond Global Warming (Manabe and Broccoli, 2020).

Awards and honors 

Manabe is a member of the United States National Academy of Sciences, and a foreign member of Japan Academy, Academia Europaea and the Royal Society of Canada.

In 1992, Manabe was the first recipient of the Blue Planet Prize of the Asahi Glass Foundation. In 1995, he received the Asahi Prize from Asahi News-Cultural Foundation. In 1997 Manabe was awarded the Volvo Environmental Prize from the Volvo Foundation. In 2015 he was awarded the Benjamin Franklin Medal of Franklin Institute.

Manabe has also been honored with the American Meteorological Society’s Carl-Gustaf Rossby Research Medal, the Second Half Century Award, and the Clarence Leroy Meisinger Award. In addition, he is honored with the American Geophysical Union’s William Bowie Medal and Revelle Medal, and in 1998 received the Milutin Milankovic Medal from the European Geophysical Society.

Manabe and Bryan's work in the development of the first global climate models has been selected as one of the Top Ten Breakthroughs to have occurred in NOAA's first 200 years. In honor of his retirement from NOAA / GFDL, a three-day scientific meeting was held in Princeton, New Jersey in March 1998.  "Understanding Climate Change: A Symposium in honor of Syukuro Manabe". The 2005 annual meeting of American Meteorological Society included a special Suki Manabe Symposium.

Jointly Manabe with climatologist James Hansen received the BBVA Foundation Frontiers of Knowledge Award in the Climate Change category in the ninth edition (2016) of the awards. The two laureates were separately responsible for constructing the first computational models with the power to simulate climate behavior. Decades ago, they correctly predicted how much Earth's temperature would rise due to increasing atmospheric . The scores of models currently in use to chart climate evolution are heirs to those developed by Manabe and Hansen.

In 2018, Manabe received the Crafoord Prize in Geosciences jointly with Susan Solomon "for fundamental contributions to understanding the role of atmospheric trace gases in Earth’s climate system".

In 2021, he received the Order of Culture.

The Nobel Prize 
In 2021, one half of the Nobel Prize in Physics was shared between Manabe and Klaus Hasselmann "for the physical modeling of Earth's climate, quantifying variability and reliably predicting global warming". Shuji Nakamura, the 2014 Nobel Prize in Physics awardee who also came from Ehime Prefecture and immigrated to the United States, congratulated Manabe on October 6.

Selected publications

See also 
 List of Nobel laureates affiliated with the University of Tokyo
 List of Nobel laureates affiliated with Princeton University
 List of Japanese Nobel laureates
 List of Asian Nobel laureates
 List of Nobel laureates

References

External links 

 
 
Syukuro Manabe on the Role of Greenhouse Gas in Climate Change (2018)

 
 

1931 births
American academics of Japanese descent
American meteorologists
American Nobel laureates
Carl-Gustaf Rossby Research Medal recipients
Japanese emigrants to the United States
Living people
Members of Academia Europaea
Members of the United States National Academy of Sciences
Nobel laureates in Physics
People from Ehime Prefecture
Recipients of the Order of Culture
University of Tokyo alumni